Diego Eduardo de Buen Juárez (born 3 July 1991) is a Mexican professional footballer who plays as a defensive midfielder for Liga MX club Puebla.

Career

Youth career
De Bueno joined Pumas youth academy in 2008. He continued through Pumas Youth Academy successfully going through Pumas Morelos and U-20. Until finally reaching the first team, Guillermo Vázquez being the coach promoting de Bueno to first team.

Santos Laguna
On 29 November 2015, Santos Laguna announced that they had reach an agreement with Club Tijuana for the services of de Buen.

Honours
Santos Laguna
Liga MX: Clausura 2018

Tampico Madero
Liga de Expansión MX: Guard1anes 2020

Mexico U20
CONCACAF U-20 Championship: 2011

References

External links
 
  
 
 
 

1991 births
Living people
Club Universidad Nacional footballers
Club Puebla players
C.F. Pachuca players
Santos Laguna footballers
Club Tijuana footballers
Tampico Madero F.C. footballers
Liga MX players
Ascenso MX players
2011 Copa América players
Mexico youth international footballers
Mexico under-20 international footballers
Footballers from Mexico City
Association football midfielders
Mexican footballers